Vegueros, from Pinar del Río Province, won its second straight Cuban National Series title, nipping Citricultores, from Matanzas Province, for the second straight year.

In a rare switch, Havana's Metropolitanos finished well ahead of its rival, Industriales. The league was marred by a corruption scandal, which saw nearly 18 players suspended.

Standings

References

 (Note - text is printed in a white font on a white background, depending on browser used.)

Cuban National Series seasons
Base
Base
1982 in baseball